Aryan Prajapati (born 12 February 2008) is an Indian child actor. He has had roles in television serials and Bollywood feature films. In 2020, he is playing the role of Hrithik Singh in Happu Ki Ultan Paltan.

Filmography

Film

Lal singh chadda -as lal singh chadda son

Television

References

Living people
Indian male television actors
Indian male film actors
21st-century Indian male actors
Indian male child actors
2008 births